Sacred Heart Catholic High School is a secondary school of the Ottawa Catholic School Board in Ottawa, Ontario, Canada. It serves as a middle school and also as a high school, having classes from grades seven to twelve. The team name is the Sacred Heart Huskies with the colours white, red and black. Sacred Heart's feeder schools include Guardian Angels Catholic Elementary School, Holy Spirit Catholic Elementary School, St. Phillips Catholic Elementary School, St. Stephen's Catholic Elementary School, Sittsville Public School and Westwind Public School.

Notable Graduates

 Erica Wiebe - Olympic Gold Medalist in Women's 75 kg. Freestyle Wrestling at the 2016 Summer Olympics

 Ryan Spooner - Drafted 45th overall in the 2010 NHL Entry Draft by the Boston Bruins. Currently plays for the Yekaterinburg Automobilist in the KHL.
 Mark Borowiecki - Drafted 139th overall in the 2008 NHL Entry Draft by the Ottawa Senators. Currently plays for the Nashville Predators in the NHL.

See also
List of Ottawa schools
List of high schools in Ontario

References 
 School profile on the Ottawa Catholic School Board website
150 years of Catholic Education in Ottawa-Carleton 1856-2006, Ottawa-Carleton Catholic School Board, 2006(Archive)

High schools in Ottawa
Educational institutions established in 1999
1999 establishments in Ontario
Middle schools in Ottawa